Khuda Aur Muhabbat is a 2016 Pakistani spiritual romantic drama television series and second installment in Khuda Aur Mohabbat series, produced by Babar Javed. It features Imran Abbas, Sadia Khan and Kubra Khan in lead roles. The season premiered on 26 December 2016.

Plot
Khuda Aur Muhabbat is a classic love story of two star-struck lovers as they struggle to fight for their love. Hammad belongs to an elite family and has recently completed his Bachelor's in Commerce. Hammad's strange encounter with Imaan, the daughter of Molvi Aleemuddin, brings an immense change in his life. Hammad's love at first sight with Imaan eventually leads him to leave his family and his lavish lifestyle as he struggles to be accepted by Imaan's family. After leaving his house, Hammad takes a job at a porter which requires hard labour. In the quest to be suitable for Imaan, Hammad finds spirituality and the true meaning of religion along the way. Despite Hammad's efforts, Moulvi Aleem refuses to understand the idea of love marriage and is unable to forgive Hammad for being in love with Imaan. Due to family pressure, Imaan is forced to marry her cousin Abdullah and begs Hammad to return to his own family. Hammad unable to subside his affection for Imaan is adamant on marrying her. Under nerve-wrecking circumstances and constant tribulations, Imaan falls ill and Hammad is left to fight alone for their love but the nature had already decided something else for Hammad.

Cast and characters

Soundtrack

Awards and nominations

References

External links
 Khuda Aur Mohabbat (season 02)

Khuda Aur Muhabbat
2016 Pakistani television seasons